Ole Holger Petersen  (born 3 March 1943) is a research professor at Cardiff University where he studies physiology, especially calcium signalling and the pancreas.  He was born in 1943 in Copenhagen, the first son of Joergen Petersen, an officer in the Danish navy, and Elisabeth née Klein, a pianist.

Prior to this he was Symers Professor of Physiology at the University of Dundee, and then George Holt Professor of Physiology at the University of Liverpool.

Petersen was elected a member of the Academia Europaea in 1988. He was elected a Fellow of the Royal Society (FRS) in 2000 "for his major contributions to the understanding of the cell physiology of calcium signalling", and appointed a Commander of the Order of the British Empire (CBE) in the 2008 New Year Honours, "for services to Science".

He is also a Fellow of the Academy of Medical Sciences (FMedSci).

References

External links 

 

1943 births
Academics of Cardiff University
University of Copenhagen alumni
Commanders of the Order of the British Empire
Fellows of the Academy of Medical Sciences (United Kingdom)
Fellows of the Royal Society
Living people
Members of Academia Europaea
Presidents of The Physiological Society